Dimerapterocis apterus is a species of beetle in the family Ciidae, the only species in the genus Dimerapterocis.

References

Ciidae genera
Beetles described in 1926